Grays Road Recreation Center is an historic recreation center, which is located in the Grays Ferry neighborhood of Philadelphia, Pennsylvania. 

It was added to the National Register of Historic Places in 1988.

History and architectural features
Designed by John T. Windrim and built between 1926 and 1927, it is a two-and-one-half-story, five-bay by nine-bay, red-brick building in the Colonial Revival style.

It has a gable roof with dormers, centrally placed arched entryway with stone surround, and two internal brick chimneys. The interior features a two-story auditorium, measuring fifty feet by thirty feet.

The building was funded by the Richard Smith Family Trust.

It was added to the National Register of Historic Places in 1988.

References

Buildings and structures on the National Register of Historic Places in Philadelphia
Colonial Revival architecture in Pennsylvania
Buildings and structures completed in 1927
South Philadelphia